"Muzzle" is a song by American alternative rock band the Smashing Pumpkins from their third album, Mellon Collie and the Infinite Sadness. It was one of the last songs written by Billy Corgan for Mellon Collie, with the song's lyrics referring to what Corgan thought the public's perception was of him at the time. It was rumored to be the Smashing Pumpkins’ fifth and final single from this album, as is evidenced by the fact that a promotional single for the song was issued to radio stations worldwide. However, the song "Thirty-Three" was released as the fifth and final single instead.

There was a rumor that a music video was actually filmed for "Muzzle" with drummer Jimmy Chamberlin, but was never released. Billy Corgan has, however, denied this. The band went on to perform "Muzzle" for their next television appearance on Late Night with Conan O'Brien with replacement drummer, Matt Walker.

Chart performance
"Muzzle" reached number 10 on the US Mainstream Rock Tracks chart and number eight on the US Modern Rock Tracks chart. It reached number one on the alternative chart in Canada.

Track listing
US promo CD
 "Muzzle" (Billy Corgan) – 3:43

Charts

See also
List of RPM Rock/Alternative number-one singles (Canada)

References

The Smashing Pumpkins songs
1995 songs
1996 singles
Song recordings produced by Alan Moulder
Song recordings produced by Billy Corgan
Song recordings produced by Flood (producer)
Songs written by Billy Corgan